Palodeia is a village in the Limassol District of Cyprus, located 2 km south of Paramytha and 7 km north of the centre of Limassol. Although the original village is small, Palodeia includes much of the surrounding land which has gradually been suburbanized. This led to a rapid growth in population in the beginning of the 21st century; the population almost doubled from 730 in 2001 to 1568 in 2011. Among the features of interest are two churches and a nursing home for veterans of EOKA, the Melathron.

References

Communities in Limassol District